The red-tailed greenbul (Criniger calurus), also known as the red-tailed bulbul, is a species of songbird in the bulbul family, Pycnonotidae, native to the African tropical rainforest.

Taxonomy and systematics
Alternate names for the red-tailed greenbul include the red-tailed bearded bulbul, red-tailed bulbul and thick-billed red-tailed greenbul.

Subspecies
Three subspecies are recognized. Additionally, the white-bearded greenbul was also originally described as a subspecies of the red-tailed greenbul: 
 Gold Coast red-tailed bulbul (C. c. verreauxi) - Sharpe, 1871: Originally described as a separate species and alternatively named as the Sierra Leone red-tailed bulbul. Found from Senegal to south-western Nigeria
 C. c. calurus - (Cassin, 1856): Found from southern Nigeria to western Democratic Republic of Congo 
 C. c. emini - Chapin, 1948: Found from north-eastern Angola and western Democratic Republic of Congo to Uganda and western Tanzania

References

External links
Image at ADW

red-tailed greenbul
Birds of the Gulf of Guinea
Birds of the African tropical rainforest
red-tailed greenbul
Taxonomy articles created by Polbot